Dalia Tórrez Zamora (born 29 March 1990 in Managua) is a Nicaraguan swimmer who competes in the Women's 100 metre butterfly. At the 2012 Summer Olympics she finished 39th overall in the heats in the Women's 100 metre butterfly and failed to reach the final.

References

Nicaraguan female swimmers
1990 births
Sportspeople from Managua
Olympic swimmers of Nicaragua
Swimmers at the 2008 Summer Olympics
Swimmers at the 2012 Summer Olympics
Swimmers at the 2016 Summer Olympics
Pan American Games competitors for Nicaragua
Swimmers at the 2011 Pan American Games
Swimmers at the 2015 Pan American Games
Female butterfly swimmers
Living people